Art for Art's Sake or Here's to Success (Swedish: Fram för framgång) is a 1938 Swedish drama film directed by Gunnar Skoglund and starring Jussi Björling, Åke Ohberg and Anders Henrikson.

The film's sets were designed by Arne Åkermark.

Cast
 Jussi Björling as Tore Nilsson  
 Åke Ohberg as Lasse Berg  
 Anders Henrikson as Rövarn  
 Erik 'Bullen' Berglund as Torman  
 Harry Roeck-Hansen as Engfeldt  
 Anders Boman as Pelle Mårtensson  
 Bror Bügler as Vadman  
 Gösta Cederlund as Theater Manager  
 Gösta Gustafson as Hallberg  
 Hugo Björne as Chief of Police  
 Richard Lund as Music Critic 
 Olle Björklund as Pilot  
 Aino Taube as Monika Malm

References

Bibliography
 Bertil Wredlund & Rolf Lindfors. Långfilm i Sverige: 1930-1939. Proprius, 1983.

External links

 

1938 films
Swedish drama films
1938 drama films
1930s Swedish-language films
Swedish black-and-white films
Films directed by Gunnar Skoglund
1930s Swedish films